Chris Bowers (born 1974) is an American blogger with OpenLeft.

Chris or Christopher Bowers may also refer to:
Christopher Bowers (canoeist) (born 1998), British slalom canoeist
Chris Bowers, actor in American TV series Rescue Me and Bionic Woman
Chris Bowers (Wealden), Liberal Democrat candidate for Wealden, England

See also
Kris Bowers (born 1989), American composer and pianist
Christopher Bowers-Broadbent (born 1945), English organist and composer